The 1952–53 season was the fifty-first season in which Dundee competed at a Scottish national level, playing in Division A, where the club would finish in 7th place.

Dundee would also compete in both the Scottish Cup and the Scottish League Cup. Dundee would become the first Scottish team to win the League Cup in consecutive seasons, with a late Bobby Flavell double giving them a 2–0 win over Kilmarnock and winning them their third major honour. They would not see this success replicated in the Scottish Cup, losing at home against Rangers. The attendance for this game, 43,024, is an all-time attendance record at Dens Park.

At the beginning of the season, Dundee would try out a unique navy-and-white quartered home kit per the request of manager George Anderson, but proved highly unpopular with both players and fans. When Anderson took ill in September 1952 and his assistant Reg Smith took over coaching duties temporarily, the team agreed to switch back to their traditional navy shirt, with the addition of navy stripes on the shorts and red socks.

Scottish Division A 

Statistics provided by Dee Archive.

League table

Scottish League Cup 

Statistics provided by Dee Archive.

Group 4

Group 4 table

Knockout stage

Scottish Cup 

Statistics provided by Dee Archive.

Player Statistics 
Statistics provided by Dee Archive

|}

See also 

 List of Dundee F.C. seasons

References

External links 

 1952-53 Dundee season on Fitbastats

Dundee F.C. seasons
Dundee